Lanelater fuscipes is a species of click beetle belonging to the family Elateridae subfamily Agrypninae.

Description
These large click beetles have a dark brown body. Usually they show a puncturation of the pronotum and an evident striation of the elytra, but the species is quite variable, especially in the length and in degree of convexity of the prothorax. Its larvae live in the coconut palms.

Distribution
This species can be found in Madagascar, Sri Lanka, India and Indochina.

References
 Biolib
 HlTOO ÔHIRA  A List of the Elaterid-Beetles from South Asia
  Bulletin of the British Museum (Natural History) Entomology series Vol 38 1979

Elateridae
Taxa named by Johan Christian Fabricius
Beetles described in 1775